The 2016 Ladbrokes World Series of Darts Finals was the second staging of the tournament, organised by the Professional Darts Corporation. The tournament took place in the Braehead Arena, Glasgow, Scotland, between 5–6 November 2016. It featured a field of 24 players.

Michael van Gerwen was the defending champion after beating Peter Wright 11–10 in last year's final. He defended his title this year by again beating Wright 11–9.

Prize money

Qualification and format

The top eight players from the six World Series events of 2016 are seeded for this tournament. They are:

2016 Dubai Duty Free Darts Masters
2016 Auckland Darts Masters
2016 Shanghai Darts Masters
2016 Tokyo Darts Masters
2016 Sydney Darts Masters
2016 Perth Darts Masters

In addition, eight players were invited as "global prospects", as were the next four highest ranked players from the PDC Order of Merit following the  2016 World Grand Prix on 9 October 2016. Another four places were awarded in a qualifying event that took place in Coventry on October 23, 2016.

The following players qualified for the tournament:

Draw

References

World Series of Darts
World Series of Darts
+2016
World Series of Darts
International sports competitions in Glasgow